Protected concerted activity is a legal term used in labor policy to define employee protection against employer retaliation in the United States.  It is a legal principle under the subject of the freedom of association.  The term defines the activities workers may partake in without fear of employer retaliation. In countries where there is relatively robust employee dismissal protection, the protection of protected concerted activity is less of a distinct legal issue. In liberal market societies like the United States, where it is comparatively easy for an employer to fire an employee, the issue of protected concerted activity has become an important employment protection.  

The National Labor Relations Act, the main labor policy governing labor relations in the United States, defines concerted activity in Section 7.  

Section 7 - Employees shall have the right to self-organization, to form, join, or assist labor organizations, to bargain collectively through representatives of their own choosing, and to engage in other concerted activities for the purpose of collective bargaining or other mutual aid or protection...

Generally speaking, there is protected concerted activity when two or more employees act together to improve their terms and conditions of employment, although it is (on rare occasions) possible for conduct to be so egregious that it becomes unprotected. Employees have a right to advocate in this manner even where there is no union involved.  

At times, protected concerted activity has extended to individual employees; for example, when an employee speaks individually to his or her employer on behalf of him or herself and one or more co-workers about improving workplace conditions. An individual employee who seeks to enforce a collective bargaining agreement will generally be deemed to be engaged in concerted activity. On the other hand, an employee who acts as a "whistleblower" may or may not be engaging in concerted activity; if the complaint is entirely individual and the employee has not discussed it with co-workers, it is unlikely to be protected by the National Labor Relations Act (though it may well be protected under some other public policy).

The Act does not limit the manner, time, or place in which employees can engage in concerted activity. Consequently, in recent years, the General Counsel of the National Labor Relations Board has often taken the position that employee conversations about common workplace issues which make use of social media such as Facebook and Twitter are protected against retaliation.

References

Labour law
Freedom of association